WGIB (91.9 FM) is a non-profit radio station that originates programming from Birmingham, Alabama, United States. The station is currently owned by Glen Iris Baptist School, and is licensed to serve Birmingham, Alabama, United States. The station was assigned the WGIB call letters by the Federal Communications Commission on September 20, 1982.

WGIB is relayed on a series of low-powered FM translators and full-powered WQEM at 101.5 MHz in Columbiana, Alabama.  The station's audio is also streamed on the internet.

Simulcast
WQEM (101.5 FM) is a radio station broadcasting a Religious radio format as a simulcast of WGIB. WQEM is licensed to serve Columbiana, Alabama, USA.  The station is currently owned by Glen Iris Baptist School.

WQEM was purchased from Clear Channel Communications in 2002.  Glen Iris kept the WQEM call sign for the station after its purchase. The station was assigned the WQEM call letters by the Federal Communications Commission on August 3, 1998.  Before its purchase by Glen Iris Baptist School, WQEM served as a repeater of Top 40 station WQEN, whose signal at the time did not adequately cover the southern suburbs of Birmingham.

Translators

See also
 W16DS-D, a co-owned low-power television station

References

External links
WGIB Online

WQEM Online

GIB
GIB
Radio stations established in 1984
Jefferson County, Alabama
1984 establishments in Alabama